Huashanentulus is a genus of proturans in the family Acerentomidae.

Species
 Huashanentulus huashanensis Yin, 1980

References

Protura